The Shahjalal Fertiliser Factory is the one of the biggest fertiliser factory in Bangladesh. It is situated at NGFF, Fenchuganj Upazila in Sylhet. The project was inaugurated by Bangladeshi prime minister Sheikh Hasina.

History 
Bangladesh Chemical Industries Corporation (BCIC), the largest corporation in industrial sector in the country was established in 1976 vide second amendment of P.0.27 upon merger of Bangladesh Paper and Board Corporation, Bangladesh Fetter, Chemical and Pharmaceutical Corporation and Bangladesh Tanneries Corporation. As present 13 (thirteen) enterprise of BCIC are in operation out of which 6 (six) are urea fertiliser factories. The total installed capacities of the above 6 (six) urea fatter factories are 2.30 million Mt per annum. Due to ageing the production capacities of 6 (six) urea fatter factories have been already decreased. Presently the demand of urea fester in the misty is about 3 million MT per annum. This demand s increasing day by day. To meet the growing demand of urea fertiliser, steps have been taken by Govt. of Bangladesh (GOB) to set up a modern technology based, energy efficient and environment friendly granular urea fertiliser factory named Shahjalal Fertilizer Project (SFP) with an annual capacity of  MT at Fenchuganj.

It was hoped, the factory will be run as Commercial Operation from January 2016. After completion of construction of SFP, import of about  MT. of urea fertiliser will be decreased in a year, as a result, equivalent amount of hard earned foreign currency will be saved. Besides, food security will be ensured as a result of application of urea fertiliser produced in the factory and the produced fertiliser will play a supportive role in food production.

References

Government-owned companies of Bangladesh
2011 establishments in Bangladesh
Fertiliser companies of Bangladesh
Fenchuganj Upazila
Economy of Sylhet